A list of Argentine-produced and co-produced feature films released in Argentina in 2017.

Films

References 

2017
Argentina